Logan Andrew Basson (born 9 March 1989) is a South African professional rugby union player who last played for  in the Rugby Challenge. He is a utility back that can play as a full-back, winger or fly-half.

Career

Youth

Basson joined the  Academy in 2008 and played for their U-19 team in the 2008 Under-19 Provincial Championship competition.

Griquas

After a loan spell at the Border Bulldogs (see below), he made seven more appearances for the  during the 2011 Vodacom Cup competition, scoring two tries.

Border Bulldogs (loan)

SWD Eagles

Border Bulldogs

Basson joined the  once again in 2012, scoring 23 points in six matches during the 2012 Vodacom Cup and making three starts for them during the 2012 Currie Cup First Division.

NMMU Madibaz

In 2013, Basson made seven appearances for Varsity Cup side , helping them to their first semi-final appearance in the competition. However, he missed a crucial penalty in injury time and they lost the match 16–15.

Griquas

Free State Cheetahs

In 2014, Basson was included in the  side that participated in the 2014 Vodacom Cup.

Border Bulldogs (2015)

Personal

Basson is the younger brother of Springbok rugby player Bjorn Basson.

References

South African rugby union players
Living people
1989 births
Sportspeople from Qonce
Border Bulldogs players
Griquas (rugby union) players
SWD Eagles players
Rugby union fly-halves
Rugby union players from the Eastern Cape